Marla Lynne Sokoloff (born December 19, 1980) is an American actress. She is known for playing Lucy Hatcher on the legal drama television series The Practice, and Gia Mahan on  Full House and Fuller House. She has also appeared in films True Crime (1996), Dude, Where's My Car? (2000), Sugar & Spice (2001) and Love on the Side (2004).

Early life
Sokoloff was born in San Francisco, to Cindi (née Sussman) and Howard Sokoloff, a former caterer and podiatrist. Her family is Jewish and originates from Russia and Germany. She graduated from the Los Angeles County High School for the Arts, where she studied music and theatre.

Career
In 1993, Sokoloff (then aged 12) began pursuing an acting career when she was cast as Gia Mahan in the ABC sitcom Full House. She was originally to play Topanga Lawrence in ABC's Boy Meets World and had even filmed a few scenes. However, the part was subsequently given to Danielle Fishel. In 1998, Sokoloff landed the role of receptionist Lucy Hatcher in the legal television drama series The Practice. Along with other popular appearances, she is well-remembered as Joey's pregnant sister, Dina, in season 8 of Friends. She also had a three-episode stint as nanny Claire in the comedy-drama series Desperate Housewives.

In 2000, she played Maggie Carter in the teen romance film Whatever It Takes.

In November 2006, she starred in the ABC television series Big Day, which ended on January 30, 2007. She also made a guest appearance in an episode of Burn Notice, where she played Melanie, working undercover as a receptionist at a Miami art gallery whose owner had murdered her character's father.

Sokoloff also has starred in several movies, including Whatever It Takes, The Climb, The Tollbooth, Dude, Where's My Car?, Sugar & Spice and Love on the Side.

In 2008, Sokoloff starred alongside Paul Campbell, Andy Griffith, Doris Roberts and Liz Sheridan in the romantic comedy Play the Game. She also voices the Glatorian Kiina in Bionicle: The Legend Reborn. She played Imogene O'Neill in the mini series Meteor.

In 2012, she starred in the television film A Christmas Wedding Date.

She reprised her role as Gia on Full Houses sequel series Fuller House, making 11 appearances starting with the second season episode "Girl Talk".

Personal life
Sokoloff dated actor James Franco for five years after they met on the set of Whatever It Takes in 1999.

In 2004, she began dating Deadsy drummer Alec Puro. They married on November 7, 2009, and have three daughters, born February 2012 March 2015 and February 2022.

Filmography

Film

Television

References

External links
 

1980 births
20th-century American actresses
21st-century American actresses
Actresses from San Francisco
American child actresses
American film actresses
American television actresses
American voice actresses
American people of Russian-Jewish descent
American people of German-Jewish descent
Jewish American actresses
Living people
Los Angeles County High School for the Arts alumni
21st-century American Jews